Savant, also known as Savant Non-profit Publications and Savant Publications, is an American not-for-profit magazine publisher in Monterey, California. While the magazine was distributed throughout the United States and internationally, charitable publications such as poetry, art, scientific papers and treatises, as well as commentary continue to be published today.

History
Savant Publications  was launched in 1977 by a group of poets and avant-garde writers and artists in Monterey, CA, who wanted to provide a platform for authors and artists in the region.  Savant has published poetry in books and magazines, local community group pamphlets and journals, scholarly works and scientific journals, papers and treatises.

Publications
Apercus 'd Rem was published from 1977 - 2000, in English language editions and 2 global editions written in the language of the circulation region.
Where Devils Tread, Chivini, 1977.   commentary on life in California;
Only the Downtrodden, Frank Amjentan, 1977.  book of poetry;
Almost in the Quicksand, Frank Amjentan, 1973. poem;
In Amongst the Pines, Peter Pestoni, 1977.   book of poetry;
Amerigine, B. Jonson, 1979.  treatise on early man in the Americas; also Amerigine
Monterey Colors, Pete Manieri, 1979.  book of word pictures set on the Monterey, California coast;
Saving the Great Beast, Gordon Elliot, 1983.  commentary on whale watching;
Missions of Mercy?, treatise on the early California missions;
Indian Summer Dreams, B. Jonson, 1987.  book of poetry and poem of same title;
With Sunglasses on His Feet, Peter Pestoni, 1988.   book of poetry;
Pipedream, Peter Pestoni, 1982. poem;
Life on a Rope, 1983.  poem;
Hope Comes with Empty Pockets to Share the Wealth, 1983.  poem;
Aching Along, Jack Freytag, 1992.  book of poetry;
Where You Lay, 1990. poem;
Where in the World is the Free Air?, Monte Davis, 1996.  commentary on free speech;
Only the Idiots, Allen B. Tranquen, 1997.   book of poetry;
Fortune (for Pascale), 1993.  poem;
When All Eyes Fall, Ed Payne, 1999.   commentary on death;
Anxious to Succeed, Gordon Elliot, 2000.  treatise on failure;
Alone on the Beach, Monty Davis, 2000.  book of poetry;
The Death of Apercus d' Rem, Peter Pestoni, 2000.   commentary;

Pioneer Publisher of Works Free of Copyright
Author agreements accepting works for publication by Savant read:''...all Savant publications are required by the by-laws of the corporation to be free of copyright..."

Poetry magazines published in the United States
Weekly magazines published in the United States
Magazines established in 1977
Magazines published in California
Non-profit publishers
Avant-garde magazines